The canton of Boixe-et-Manslois is an administrative division of the Charente department, southwestern France. It was created at the French canton reorganisation which came into effect in March 2015. Its seat is in Vars.

It consists of the following communes:
 
Ambérac
Anais
Aunac-sur-Charente
Aussac-Vadalle
Cellefrouin
Cellettes
La Chapelle
Chenon
Coulonges
Fontenille
Juillé
Lichères
Lonnes
Luxé
Maine-de-Boixe
Mansle-les-Fontaines
Montignac-Charente
Mouton
Moutonneau
Nanclars
Puyréaux
Saint-Amant-de-Boixe
Saint-Ciers-sur-Bonnieure
Saint-Front
Saint-Groux
La Tâche
Tourriers
Val-de-Bonnieure
Valence
Vars
Ventouse
Vervant
Villejoubert
Villognon
Vouharte
Xambes

References

Cantons of Charente